Fantastic Mr Fox is a musical stage adaptation of the children's novel of the same name by Roald Dahl, adapted by Sam Holcroft with music by Arthur Darvill and lyrics by Holcroft, Darvill, Darren Clark and Al Muriel. The story follows Mr Fox who hatches a plan to outsmart his three farmer neighbours in order to feed his family and friends.

Background 
In March 2016, it was announced that the musical, directed by Maria Aberg and designed by Tom Scutt, would be given its premiere at the Nuffield Theatre, Southampton, over the Christmas season, from 30 November 2016 to 8 January 2017. It is co-produced by the Nuffield and Curve, Leicester, in association with the Lyric Hammersmith.

The musical toured in 2017 to Cardiff New Theatre (21 to 25 February), Dartford Orchard Theatre (28 February to 5 March), Milton Keynes Theatre (7 to 11 March), Oxford Playhouse (11 to 15 April), Belgrade Theatre Coventry (18 to 22 April), Lyceum Theatre Sheffield (2 to 6 May), King's Theatre Edinburgh (15 to 20 May), Theatre Royal Glasgow (22 to 27 May), Theatre Royal Bath (30 May to 3 June), Wycombe Swan (5 to 10 June), Theatre Royal Plymouth (13 to 17 June), Theatre Royal Norwich (21 to 24 June), Bradford Alhambra Theatre (27 June to 2 July), Lowry Theatre Salford (5 to 9 July). More dates are to be announced.

Cast and characters

References

External links 

2016 musicals
Musicals based on novels
Musicals based on works by Roald Dahl
British musicals